Lygo is a surname. Notable people with the surname include:

Carl Lygo (born 1967), British barrister and academic
Ian Lygo (born 1958), British civil servant
Kevin Lygo (born 1957), British television executive
Mark Lygo, English politician
Raymond Lygo (1924–2012), British Royal Navy officer